Barbara McGivern (born August 15, 1945 – March 9, 2019), also known as The Gold Lady, was a Canadian artist from Toronto, Ontario. One of her best known series is The Extraordinary Journey. The series was inspired by her trips through the deserts of Oman and Saudi Arabia, when she began incorporating the use of gold leaf into her work. Her style is most notable for presenting gold as a colour rather than as a precious metal. Her paintings are in private and corporate collections in Canada, Europe and the Middle East.

Early life and education
McGivern grew up in Toronto and for almost 40 years maintained a residence at the Manulife Centre which was a gathering place for members of the local arts community. In 1971 she went to Europe, for five years. Settling in London in the fall of 1974 she became a member of both The Arts Club and Chelsea Arts Club.
Returning to Toronto in 1976 she worked with Columbia Pictures Television until 1981 when they stopped producing TV programs. McGivern then started painting at her first art studio in downtown Toronto. Her work at that time was mostly naive and was inspired by the English artist Beryl Cook.  Around that time she got accepted by the Ontario College of Art and Design  she studied under Canadian artists such as Graham Coughtry and Ian Carr-Harris. She graduated in 1988 in Experimental Arts at OCAD.
In 1992 McGivern went to Russia where she saw works by the Impressionist artist Matisse at the Hermitage and Fernando Botero at the Pushkin, Moscow. During the same trip she saw the Barnes Collection at the Musée d'Orsay, Paris. She produced a series of paintings based on Impressionist works, with her own interpretation of The Barnes Collection, which was later shown at Musee Hotel Baudy in Giverny. Throughout the 90's McGivern was represented by galleries in Yorkville, Toronto, Montreal, Edmonton as well as Zurich, Berlin, London, Paris and Madrid.

The Extraordinary Journey 
In 1996 McGivern went on an off-road driving trip across the Middle East, following the British adventurer Wilfred Thesiger's path through the deserts of Oman and Saudi Arabia, covering 3,000 miles in eight days. While driving through the deserts she was amazed with the colours she saw and the richness of the sands which opened up a new concept to her work, where her acrylic paintings now recounted the deserts from a Canadian prospective, using gold as a colour as opposed to a precious metal. "My paintings are inspired by my trips, especially to the deserts of Oman and the UAE. I found the dunes to be a magical place with colours that I never thought could be possible in such a vastness of sand" stated McGivern in 1998. She was commissioned to do 22 paintings for the Jumeirah Emirates Towers Hotel. Her work has been sold to major collectors such as Sheikh Mohammed bin Rashid Al Maktoum and the Al Qasimi, UAE as well as different corporate collectors. When asked to do two horses for the Dubai's Celebration of Arabian Horses, her horse Victory was commissioned by Frayland and Penquin, Engineering and was the third largest winner in the auction held by Christie's for 210,000 AED. The second horse Red Fantasy was also commissioned by Delwood Consultancy. McGivern represented Canada at the Women & Art, 2005, A Global Perspective, Sharjah UAE.

Solo exhibitions
 2009 Lando Gallery, Edmonton, Alberta, Canada
 2009 Gallerie Bohner, Manhiem, Germany
 2008 Arts Club, London, England
 2007 Lindsay Gallery, Lindsay, Ontario.
 2006 Nomad Gallery, London, England
 2006 Spoke Gallery, Toronto, Ontario
 2005 Grand Canvas', Majlis Gallery, Grand Hyatt, Dubai, UAE
 2005 Lando Gallery, Edmonton, Alberta
 2005 INDEX 05, Canadian Pavilion, Dubai, UAE
 2004 Extraordinary Journey, Majlis Gallery, Dubai, UAE
 2004 INDEX 04, Canadian Pavilion, Dubai, UAE
 2002 Westdale Gallery, Hamilton, Ontario
 2001 Paintings in My Mind, Teodora Art Gallery, Toronto
 2000 Makepeace, McGivern, Furniture & Painting, Prime Gallery, Toronto
 1999 Teodora Art Gallery, Original Sense, Toronto, Ontario
 1999 Extraordinary Journey, Ozten Zeki Gallery London, England
 1997 The Barnes Collection Series, Musée Hotel Baudy, Giverny, France
 1997 Extraordinary Journey, Teodora Art Gallery, Toronto
 1996 An Evening in the Eastend, Teodora Art Gallery, Toronto
 1995 Galerie Company, Paris, France 1993 Schieder & Assoc., Toronto 1988-93 Various Solo Shows

Museum exhibitions 
Barbara's work has been shown in the following museum exhibitions:
 2007 The Lindsay Gallery, Lindsay, Ontario
 2005 Vernon Art Gallery, Vernon, B.C
 2004 Glynhurst Art Gallery, Brantford, Ontario
 2004 Temiskaming Art Gallery, Extraordinary Journey, Haileybury

Museum collections 
Barbara's work can be found in the following museum collections:
 Museum of Contemporary Canadian Art, Toronto
 The Robert McLaughlin Gallery, Oshawa
 University College, University of Toronto
 Art Gallery of Lethbridge, Lethbridge, Alberta
 Art Gallery of Mississauga
 Art Gallery of Peel, Brampton
 Baycrest Centre, Toronto
 Mt. Sinai Hospital, Toronto
 Princess Margaret Hospital, Toronto

Selected collections 
 HH General Sheikh Mohammed Bin Rashid Al Maktoum
 Vice President and Prime Minister of the UAE and Ruler of Dubai
 Cee Cee Holdings, Dubai, UAE
 Royal Collection, Sharjah, UAE
 Compass, Dubai, UAE
 Designdivision, Dubai, UAE
 Emirates Tower Hotel, Dubai, UAE
 Eytzinger Gold, Schwabach, Germany
 Ghandour Building, Beirut, Lebanon
 Bernstein Hounsfield & Assoc., London, England
 Cannex Financial Inc., Toronto
 Danson, Zucker & Connelly, Toronto
 Electric Light Company, London, England
 Lever Brothers, Toronto
 Saatchi & Saatchi, Compton Hayhurst, (Canada) Ltd.
 Teck Corporation, Vancouver, B.C.
 Union Carbide, Toronto

Group exhibitions
Barbara's work has been part of the following group exhibitions:
 2000 Bait Muzna Gallery, Muscat, Sultanate of Oman
 1999 NOT the Royal Academy Show, London, England
 1999 Royal Academy Summer Show, selected but not hung, London, England
 1999 Pratt & Whitney, Invited Artist, Mississauga, Ontario, Canada
 1999 Teodora Art Gallery, Toronto, Ontario, Canada
 1998 Majlis Gallery, Dubai, UAE
 1998 Teodora Art Gallery, Toronto, Ontario, Canada
 1998 Royal Academy Summer Show, Selected but not hung, London, England
 1998 NOT the Royal Academy Show, Salon des Refuses, London, England
 1997 Art Expo '97, Teodora Art Gallery, New York, United States
 1997 THE ART & TECHNOLOGY CIRCUS, Audart, New York, United States
 1997 The Majlis Gallery, Dubai, UAE.
 1996 "GIFTS FROM THE PERMANENT COLLECTION", Art Gallery of North York
 1996 "TNT", Audart Gallery, New York, United States
 1996 Miami Art Fair, Miami, Florida (Teodora Art Gallery)
 1995 A.C.I. (juried) Virtuosity Art Fair, New York, N.Y. Bau-Xi Art Gallery
 1995 Teodora Art Gallery
 1994 Schieder & Associates Gallery, Toronto, Ontario, Canada
 1993 Schieder & Associates Gallery, Toronto, Ontario, Canada
 1992 John B. Aird Gallery, Toronto, Ontario, Canada
 1992 Art Contemporain du Canada, Adar Tajan, Paris, France
 1992 Kenneith Gallery, Sarnia, Ontario, Canada
 1990 Sarnia Public Gallery, (Juried), Sarnia, Ontario, Canada
 1990 Peel Regional Art Gallery, (Juried), Brampton, Ontario, Canada
 1989 Latcham Gallery, (Juried), Stouffville, Ontario, Canada
 1988 Bonnie Kagan Gallery, Toronto, Ontario, Canada

Commissions 
McGivern has been commissioned by the following companies:
 Swarovski Crystals, Dubai, UAE
 Emirates Tower Hotel, Dubai, UAE
 JL Albright Venture Partners, Toronto, Ontario, Canada
 ArtWorks, Dubai, UAE
 Frayland Consulting and Interiors, Dubai, UAE
 Dellwood Consultancy, Dubai, UAE
 Unesco, Christmas cards 2003–2004, Snecma Moteurs, CDC IXIS Securities
 Matrix Hotel, Edmonton, Alberta, Canada
 Luigi Malones, Dublin, Ireland

Auctions 
Barbara's work has been auctioned by the following:
 2013 Contemporary Canadian Art, Heffler Fine Art, Toronto, ON, Canada
 2009 The Arts Club, Bonham's, London, England
 2009 Bonham's, Toronto, ON, Canada
 2006 The Arabian Horse, Christie's, Dubai, UAE
 1993 Art Contemporain du Canada, Ader Tajan, Paris, France

References

External links
 Society of Canadian Artist
 Centre for Contemporary Canadian Art

1955 births
2019 deaths
20th-century Canadian women artists
21st-century Canadian women artists
Artists from Toronto
OCAD University alumni